Ramorinoa girolae is a species of flowering plant in the legume family, Fabaceae. It belongs to the subfamily Faboideae, and was recently assigned to the informal monophyletic Pterocarpus clade within the Dalbergieae. It is the only member of the genus Ramorinoa. Unlike most legumes, Ramorinoa girolae does not produce any leaves.

References

Dalbergieae
Monotypic Fabaceae genera
Taxa named by Carlo Luigi Spegazzini